Slocene is a river in Zemgale, historical region of Latvia. It flows  through the Tukums municipality and Engure municipality into the Lake Kaņieris within the territory of the Ķemeri National Park.

References

Rivers of Latvia